Golden Grove is an outer north-eastern suburb of Adelaide, South Australia and is within the City of Tea Tree Gully local government area. It is adjacent to Wynn Vale, Surrey Downs, Greenwith, Yatala Vale, Fairview Park, and Salisbury East.

History 
Captain Adam Robertson and his wife arrived in South Australia in September 1839, and settled in the area now known as Golden Grove. He donated an acre (4,000 m2) of land to people of the area in 1853, in order for them to build a school they were planning, and allowed it to be named Golden Grove, after the last ship he commanded. (In 1859, however, when the postal authorities wanted to name the town Golden Grove, he objected unsuccessfully.)

Freestone quarries in the area were used from early settlement days to provide building materials.

In 1930, the Golden Grove house and farm were sold. Most of the estate was later purchased by a sand mining company, Boral, in 1972. In 1973 the South Australian Land Commission started to acquire land in Golden Grove and Wynn Vale for housing. In 1983 the South Australian Urban Land Trust contracted Lend Lease (then Delfin) to develop the land. Construction started in 1985 and over 200 allotments sold in the first week, with the last being sold in 2002.

Two wells located at what is now the intersection of Hancock Road and Golden Grove Road serviced farms and dairies in Golden Grove and Yatala Vale, and provided water for council work and firefighting. The last well was filled in during March 1995 after having been dry for many years.

In 2007, further land was released at Golden Grove. This land was acquired by Fairmont Homes, as a new housing division. There is a small shopping complex, a nursing home, and a retirement village. 220 blocks of land were released. The land is known as 'The Settlement' estate, seeing as this was the land of Captain Adam Robertson (hence the name 'Captain Robertson Drive'), who named the suburb of Golden Grove (as above).

Captain Robertson's original homestead still stands, centered in the new development.

Geography 

The boundary of Golden Grove is defined by Slate and Cobbler Creeks to the north, the Cobbler Creek Park to the west, Helicon Drive, Surrey Farm Drive and The Grove Way (including the three-school campus and shopping centre), Golden Grove and Hancock Roads (wrapping around Surrey Downs) and Yatala Vale Road to the south, and Seaview Road and the quarries to the east.

Facilities 

The three major high schools in the area are Gleeson College, Pedare Christian College and Golden Grove High School in the suburb's southwestern corner. They are linked together in a complex that also includes the Golden Grove Recreation Centre. Golden Grove Primary School and Pedare Primary Campus are also located in the suburb.

The Grove Shopping Centre (previously "Golden Grove Village") has a number of retailers, including Big W, Woolworths, Drakes as well as dining, specialty stores and banks.

A police station was opened on 18 December 2006.

2010 saw the opening of the Harpers Field complex, adjacent to One Tree Hill Road & Crouch Road which is currently home to the Golden Grove Football Club, Golden Grove Cricket Club & Golden Grove Softball Club

The 288ha Cobbler Creek Recreation Park is accessible from nearby Gulfview Heights.

Transport 

There is a bus interchange at the Golden Grove Village, which is operated by Adelaide Metro. On the 10th of November 2020, a total of $33 million was funded by the South Australian state government to provide for a new Adelaide Metro Park & Ride facility in Golden Grove. The facility provides for bus stop 62A The Grove Way, a connecting stop to and from the Adelaide O'Bahn bus corridor. The project has been completed as part of the PTP Allowance and the Department for Infrastructure and Transport. The Park 'n' Ride was set to account for the large patronage the area sees of bus commuters toward the Adelaide CBD and surrounding suburbs. Construction began in April 2021. The project saw new Adelaide Metro signage erected and the final phases of completion throughout February and March 2022. It was officially opened on 7 March 2022. Proposals exist to extend the Adelaide O-Bahn to Golden Grove, but the route it might take from Tea Tree Plaza Interchange is unknown.

See also 
 City of Tea Tree Gully
 List of Adelaide suburbs

References

External links 
 Golden Grove - Local Community Profile

Suburbs of Adelaide